Montana (stylized in all caps) is the third studio album by American rapper French Montana. It was released on December 6, 2019 through Epic Records, Bad Boy, Coke Boys and Montana Entertainment. The production on the album was handled by multiple producers including Harry Fraud, Louis Bell, London on da Track, Cardo, Rvssian and Murda Beatz among others. The album also features guest appearances by Post Malone, Swae Lee, Kodak Black, Cardi B, Chris Brown, PartyNextDoor, ASAP Rocky and many others.

Montana was supported by seven singles: "No Stylist", "Slide", "Wiggle It", "Suicide Doors", "Writing on the Wall", "Twisted" and "Out of Your Mind". It also includes the singles "Lockjaw" featuring Kodak Black and "No Shopping" featuring Drake, which were previously released on Montana's 2016 mixtape MC4. The album received mixed reviews from music critics and poor commercial performance. It debuted at number 25 on the US Billboard 200 chart, earning 25,000 album-equivalent units in its first week.

Promotion
French Montana shared a trailer for the album directed by Kid Art, which features him "surrounded by a line of women in thigh-high red boots and dark burqas" and was called "connecting with his Muslim roots". The trailer features an unnamed Harry Fraud and 24–produced track.

Commercial performance
Montana debuted at number 25 on the US Billboard 200 chart, earning 25,000 album-equivalent units (including 6,000 copies in pure album sales) in its first week. This became Montana's lowest first week sales and lowest charting album to date. On December 5, 2019, the album was certified gold by the Recording Industry Association of America (RIAA) for combined sales and album-equivalent units of over 500,000 units in the United States.

Track listing
Credits adapted from Tidal.

Personnel
Credits adapted from Tidal.

 Mixx – recording 
 ADHD – recording 
 Jaycen Joshua – mixing 
 Jacob Richards – mixing , mixing assistant , engineering assistant 
 Rashawn McLean – mixing , mixing assistant , engineering assistant 
 Mike Seaberg – mixing , mixing assistant , engineering assistant 
 John Sparkz – mixing 
 Colin Leonard – mastering 
 Tommy Tee – writer

Charts

Certifications

References

2019 albums
French Montana albums
Albums produced by Cardo
Albums produced by Cool & Dre
Albums produced by Harry Fraud
Albums produced by Juicy J
Albums produced by London on da Track
Albums produced by Louis Bell
Albums produced by Murda Beatz